Maurício Ernesto Pequenino (born 27 September 1983) is a Mozambican footballer who plays as a striker for Maxaquene.

He joined South African Premier Soccer League side Golden Arrows in early 2008 from Desportivo Maputo where he finished as Moçambola's topscorer in 2005 and 2006.

External links 
 Desportivo Maputo 2006-07 squad list at Desportivo.co.mz 

1983 births
Living people
Sportspeople from Maputo
Mozambican footballers
Mozambican expatriate footballers
Mozambique international footballers
GD Maputo players
Association football forwards
Liga Desportiva de Maputo players
Moçambola players
Lamontville Golden Arrows F.C. players
Expatriate soccer players in South Africa
Mozambican expatriate sportspeople in South Africa